Durdidwarrah is a township located about 75 km west of Melbourne, Victoria, Australia.

References

Towns in Victoria (Australia)
Golden Plains Shire